Elections to Trafford Council were held on 1 May 2003. One third of the council was up for election, with each successful candidate to serve a one-year term of office, expiring in 2004 due to the boundary changes and 'all-out' elections due to take place that year. The Labour Party lost overall control of the council, to no overall control. Overall turnout was 52.3%.

After the election, the composition of the council was as follows:

Summary

Ward results

References

2003 English local elections
2003
2000s in Greater Manchester